Parablepisanis is a genus of longhorn beetles of the subfamily Lamiinae, containing the following species:

 Parablepisanis feai Breuning, 1950
 Parablepisanis rufa Breuning, 1956

References

Saperdini